Rand Donald Conger (born August 29, 1941) is Distinguished Professor Emeritus of Human Development & Family Studies at the University of California, Davis. He previously taught at Iowa State University, where he was the founding director of the Institute for Social and Behavioral Research. He is known for his research on risk factors for, and protective factors against, substance use and mental disorders. He has also researched the effects of stress on child development and academic achievement.

References

External links

1941 births
Living people
American social psychologists
Developmental psychologists
People from Tacoma, Washington
University of California, Davis faculty
University of Washington alumni
Iowa State University faculty
American psychologists